Dirk Wittenborn (born 1952 in New Haven, Connecticut) is an American screenwriter and novelist.

Biography
Wittenborn was born into a family of scientists. He has two older sisters and an older brother. He graduated from the University of Pennsylvania and started writing in the early 1980s while working at Saturday Night Live. Wittenborn is married and has a child, Lilo Wittenborn. His nephew is James Wittenborn "Jamie" Johnson, a film director, with whom he produced the Emmy-nominated HBO documentary Born Rich.

Works

Fiction
Pharmakon (2008)
Fierce People (2002), cinematized in 2005 under the same name.
Zoë (1983) (republished 2004 as Catwalk)
Eclipse (1980)

Nonfiction

"The Social Climber's Bible" (2014)
Bongo Europa (2006)

Film
The Lucky Ones (2008)
Fierce People (2005)
Born Rich (2003) (producer)

References

External links

Brooklyn Heights
Dirk Wittenborn: a history of brain candy - and why it brought my father nothing but misery
One Pill Makes You Happy, and One Pill Makes You Mad

American male screenwriters
University of Pennsylvania alumni
Living people
1952 births
Writers from New Haven, Connecticut
20th-century American novelists
21st-century American novelists
American male novelists
20th-century American male writers
21st-century American male writers
Novelists from Connecticut
20th-century American non-fiction writers
21st-century American non-fiction writers
American male non-fiction writers
Screenwriters from Connecticut